Norman Thomas Mann (March 3, 1914 — February 9, 1994) was an English-born Canadian professional ice hockey player who played 31 games in the National Hockey League with the Toronto Maple Leafs between 1936 and 1941. The rest of his career, which lasted from 1933 to 1949, was mainly spent in the minor American Hockey League. Mann was born in Bradford, England, but grew up in Newmarket, Ontario.

Career statistics

Regular season and playoffs

See also
List of National Hockey League players from the United Kingdom

External links

1914 births
1994 deaths
British expatriates in Canada
Cleveland Barons (1937–1973) players
English ice hockey right wingers
Newmarket Redmen players
Ontario Hockey Association Senior A League (1890–1979) players
Philadelphia Ramblers players
Pittsburgh Hornets players
Providence Reds players
Sportspeople from Newmarket, Ontario
Syracuse Stars (AHL) players
Syracuse Stars (IHL) players
Toronto Maple Leafs players